Motegi may refer to
 Motegi, Tochigi, a town in Japan
Mobility Resort Motegi, a motorsport race track located at Motegi
Motegi Station, a railway station in Motegi
 Motegi (surname)